Gârcina is a commune in Neamț County, Western Moldavia, Romania. It is composed of three villages: Almaș, Cuejdiu, and Gârcina.

Natives
 Melchisedec Ștefănescu

References

Communes in Neamț County
Localities in Western Moldavia